The 1964 Meath Senior Football Championship is the 71st edition of the Meath GAA's premier club Gaelic football tournament for senior graded teams in County Meath, Ireland. The tournament consists of 10 teams. The championship employed a straight knock-out format.

This season saw Kilbride's debut in the top flight after claiming the 1962 Meath Intermediate Football Championship title. The famous Bohermeen club which won 6 S.F.C. title in a row (1909-1914) was reformed this year and entered the J.B.F.C. ranks. This was Athboy parish rivals Martinstown and Rathmore's first year in existence, both of whom entered the J.F.C.

Trim were the defending champions after they defeated Ballinlough in the previous years final, however they lost their crown to Navan O'Mahonys at the First Round stage.

Navan O'Mahonys claimed their 7th S.F.C. (in 11 years) title on 25 August 1963 when defeating St. Vincent's in the final by 4-6 to 1-2 at Pairc Tailteann. Paddy Fitzsimons raised the Keegan Cup for the Navan parish outfit. 

At the end of the season Athboy and Ballivor were regraded to the 1964 I.F.C. after 3 and 15 years respectively as senior clubs.

Team Changes
 

The following teams have changed division since the 1962 championship season.

To S.F.C.
Promoted from I.F.C.
 Kilbride - (Intermediate Champions).

From S.F.C.
Regraded to I.F.C.
 Donaghmore
 St. Peter's Dunboyne
 Syddan

First round
Four teams enter this round selected by random draw. The winner progresses to the quarter-finals.

 Skryne 4-5, 0-4 Ballivor, Trim, 12/5/1963,
 Navan O'Mahonys 2-2, 0-3 Trim, Kells, 12/5/1963,

Quarter-finals
The remaining 6 clubs along with the Round 1 winner enter this round.

 St. Vincent's 1-9, 1-2 Athboy, Pairc Tailteann, 12/5/1963,
 Kilbride 1-7, 1-5 Ballinlough, Pairc Tailteann, 12/5/1963,
 Navan O'Mahonys 2-6, 2-5 Drumree, Trim, 10/6/1963,
 Skryne 0-12, 1-8 Drumbaragh, Pairc Tailteann, 7/7/1963,

Semi-finals

 St. Vincent's 2-7, 1-5 Kilbride, Pairc Tailteann, 10/6/1963,
 Navan O'Mahonys 3-4, 2-7 Skryne, Kells, 14/7/1963,
 Navan O'Mahonys 1-6, 1-4 Skryne, Kells, 21/7/1963, (Replay)

Final

 Navan O'Mahonys 4-6, 1-2 St. Vincent's, Pairc Tailteann, 25/8/1963,

References

External links

Meath Senior Football Championship
Meath Senior Football Championship